Kharota Syedan is a village on the northern outskirts of Sialkot, Punjab, Pakistan. The villages has community services such as primary and secondary education, a post office, mosques, and banks. The town has utilities including gas, electricity, water, and telephone communications. The banks don't have ATM machines and bank cards aren't accepted on shops.

Geography 
Kharota Syedan lies on the outskirts of Sialkot township. It is about 250 km southwest of Islamabad, the capital of Pakistan. To the west is the Chenab river. To the east are the mountains of the Himalayas.

References

Villages in Sialkot District